The UK Rock & Metal Singles Chart is a record chart which ranks the best-selling rock and heavy metal songs in the United Kingdom. Compiled and published by the Official Charts Company, the data is based on each song's weekly physical sales, digital downloads (since 2007) and streams (since 2015), and is currently published every Friday. The chart was first published on 9 October 1994, when American hard rock band Bon Jovi was number one with the Cross Road single "Always".

As of the chart ending on 23 February 2023, a total of 389 songs have topped the UK Rock & Metal Singles Chart. 11 artists have topped the chart with eight or more different songs. The most successful are American group Foo Fighters and British rock band Muse who have both reached number one with 15 different songs. Five more artists have topped the chart with ten or more different songs: Linkin Park has 13 while Bon Jovi and My Chemical Romance with 12 each, and Nickelback with 11 each and Bring Me the Horizon with 10.

Artists
The following artists have been credited on at least eight different number one songs, as recognised by the OCC.

See also
List of artists by number of UK Rock & Metal Albums Chart number ones
List of artists by number of UK Albums Chart number ones
List of artists by number of UK Singles Chart number ones

References

External links
Official UK Rock & Metal Singles Chart Top 40 at the Official Charts Company
The Official UK Top 40 Rock Singles at BBC Radio 1

Lists of artists by record chart achievement